György Gát (born 5 February 1947, in Budapest, Hungary) (sometimes credited as George Gat) is a Hungarian television director and producer. He is also a regular lecturer at ELTE University in Budapest.

Biography
Gat's first hit was the crime-comedy TV series "Linda" (1984–1989). "Linda" starred his wife Nóra Görbe.

It was during the pre-production of "Linda" that Gát became Hungary's first independent television producer - a position that at the time the regime did not acknowledge.

He subsequently created series "Angyalbőrben" (1990–1991), "Familia Kft." (1991–1997), "TV a város szélén" (1998), "SztárVár" (2005) and the animated series "Szerencsi fel!" (2004).

In 2008 he co-wrote and co-directed a sequel to animated movie Vuk (film), called "A Kis Vuk" (in English: A Fox's Tale).

References

1947 births
Hungarian television directors
Hungarian film directors
Hungarian television producers
Hungarian Jews
Living people
Television people from Budapest
Hungarian animated film directors